The 1999–2000 season was the 31st season of competitive association football in Australia.

National teams

Australia national soccer team

Results and fixtures

Friendlies

OFC Nations Cup
In Australia's fourth OFC Nations Cup run, they were declared Champions after they won 2–0 against New Zealand and had conceded no goals through their whole run in the 2000 OFC Nations Cup.

Group A

Knockout stage

LG Cup

Australia national under-23 soccer team

Australia national under-17 soccer team

Australia national women's soccer team

Friendlies

OFC competitions

Oceania Club Championship

Group stage

Knockout stage

Semi-finals

|}

Final

|}

Men's soccer

National Soccer League

Women's soccer

Women's National Soccer League

Grand Final
The 1999 Women's National Soccer League Grand Final was played at Marconi Stadium on 20 November. The match was contested between the NSW Sapphires and the SASI Pirates. NSW won the Grand Final in a 1–0 victory by an own goal by Dianne Alagich in the 18th minute.

References

1999 in Australian soccer
2000 in Australian soccer
Seasons in Australian soccer